The 2018 elections for the Oregon Legislative Assembly determined the composition of both houses for the 80th Oregon Legislative Assembly. The Republican and Democratic parties held primary elections on May 15, 2018 with general elections on November 6, 2018.

As a result of the elections, the Democratic Party expanded its advantage in both houses of the state legislature. The party gained one seat in the Oregon State Senate and three seats in the Oregon House of Representatives, bringing its advantage over the Republican Party to 18-12 and 38-22, respectively. These gains gave the Democratic Party a 3/5 (or 60%) supermajority in both chambers for the 80th Oregon Legislative Assembly.

Oregon Senate

The 30 members of the Oregon State Senate are elected to four-year terms, and only half of those seats (15) are up for election every two years. In addition to these 15 regular elections, there were two special elections to determine who would complete the four-year terms of Senators that were replaced during the first half of their term.  These 17 seats up for election were represented by 10 Democrats and 7 Republicans. The Democrats decreased their advantage over Republicans from 18-12 to 17-13 in the 2016 election.

Open seat
 In District 3, incumbent Republican Alan DeBoer retired.

Results

Oregon House of Representatives

The 60 members of the Oregon House of Representatives are elected to two-year terms, so all 60 seats were up for election. In this election, these seats were represented by 35 Democrats and 25 Republicans. The Democrats maintained their 35-25 advantage in the 2016 election.

Open seats
 In District 6, incumbent Republican Sal Esquivel retired.
 In District 11, incumbent Democrat Phil Barnhart retired.
 In District 15, incumbent Republican Andy Olson retired.
 In District 32, incumbent Democrat Deborah Boone retired.
 In District 39, incumbent Republican Bill Kennemer retired.
 In District 53, incumbent Republican Gene Whisnant retired.
 In District 54, incumbent Republican Knute Buehler retired to run for Oregon Governor.

Results

See also
79th Oregon Legislative Assembly (2017-2018)
80th Oregon Legislative Assembly (2019-2020)

References

2018 Oregon elections
Oregon Legislative Assembly elections
Oregon legislative